Living My Life is the sixth studio album by Grace Jones, released in 1982. It was the last of three albums she recorded at the Compass Point Studios in the Bahamas.

Background and production
Jones had already recorded two new wave/reggae-oriented albums with the Compass Point All Stars at the Compass Point Studios in Nassau, Bahamas, with the most recent, Nightclubbing, becoming her most successful record to date. She went back into the studio in 1982 to record an album which would be her final offering in the unofficial Compass Point trilogy. This time around, Jones recorded only one cover, "The Apple Stretching", which was originally written by Melvin Van Peebles and used in the Broadway show Waltz of the Stork. "Nipple to the Bottle" was co-written with Sly Dunbar, while, apart from "My Jamaican Guy", the other tracks were collaborations with Barry Reynolds.

The title track "Living My Life", despite receiving a limited single release, was ultimately left off the album. Further outtakes included the track "Man Around the House" (written by Jones and Barry Reynolds), and a cover of Johnny Cash's "Ring of Fire". Both tracks were released on the 1998 compilation Private Life: The Compass Point Sessions.

The album was a commercial success, reaching the top 20 in five countries. In March 1983, Island Records vice president Herb Corsack claimed to Billboard magazine that the sales of the album had surpassed 400,000 copies.

Artwork
The Living My Life cover picture has been described as famous as the music featured on the record itself. Like the majority of Jones' artworks at that time, this one was created by her then-partner Jean-Paul Goude, this time with an additional contribution from Rob O'Connor. It features the singer's disembodied head cut out from the original photograph and pasted onto a blank white background in a way that gives her head and face an angular shape. A piece of tape, or a plaster, has been pasted over her left eyebrow, and her forehead is covered with drops of water, or sweat. This cover, as many other Goude's designs for Jones, has won critical acclaim and has been an inspiration for other artists ever since.

The picture was re-used for the cover of the 2006 compilation Colour Collection, a re-release of The Universal Masters Collection.

Singles
The urban-flavoured "Nipple to the Bottle" and reggae-oriented "The Apple Stretching" were released simultaneously as lead singles. "Nipple to the Bottle" received a worldwide release, becoming a highly popular dance track in the US, as well as a top three hit in New Zealand. The latter was not released in the North America and achieved only moderate success in Europe.

Three more singles were then simultaneously released in January 1983, of which "My Jamaican Guy" turned out the most successful. "Cry Now, Laugh Later", released only in the US and Canada, and "Unlimited Capacity for Love" did not chart.

In 2010 "Inspiration" was remixed to a 7:14 "Leroc Sportif Edit" and released as a one-track digital only single in February.

Track listing
All tracks produced by Chris Blackwell and Alex Sadkin.

Personnel
 Benji Armbrister – engineering assistance
 Wally Badarou – keyboards
 Chris Blackwell – production
 Michael Brauer – mixing (track 6)
 Mikey Chung – guitar
 Sly Dunbar – drums, syndrum
 Jean-Paul Goude – design, sleeve photography
 Grace Jones – vocals
 Rob O'Connor – design
 Barry Reynolds – guitar
 Trevor Rogers – photography
 Alex Sadkin – organ, production, engineering, mixing (tracks 5 and 7)
 Robbie Shakespeare – bass guitar
 Steven Stanley – engineering, mixing (tracks 1, 2, 3, 4)
 Uziah Thompson – percussion
 Ted Jensen at Sterling Sound, NYC - mastering

Charts

Weekly charts

Year-end charts

Certifications and sales

Release history

References

External links
 Living My Life on AllMusic
 Living My Life on Discogs
 Living My Life on Rate Your Music

1982 albums
Albums produced by Alex Sadkin
Albums produced by Chris Blackwell
Grace Jones albums
Island Records albums